This article provides line graphs and bar charts of scientific, nationwide public opinion polls that have been conducted relating to the 2008 United States presidential election. All graph data is taken from Nationwide opinion polling for the United States presidential election, 2008 and Statewide opinion polling for the United States presidential election, 2008. This page was last updated on November 8, 2008.

Obama v. McCain

This shows the results of all polls from December 8, 2006 through November 4, 2008. The horizontal lines represent actual voting results on November 4.

Obama v. McCain by individual pollster

With the election near at hand, a closer look was needed to better see the ebb and flow from day to day.  Since each pollster may have had a different set of parameters, it was useful to look at line graphs of a number of them on one page to better discern trends. Horizontal dashed lines represent actual final voting.

Obama v. McCain v. Barr v. Nader

Seven-way race

Line graph, all candidates

Democrats v. Republicans

External links

Key Electoral States Polls and Actual Results
Key States, Polls vs Actual Results

Candidates v. all opponents
Obama composite
McCain composite
Hillary composite
Gore composite
Giuliani composite

Individual two-way races
Obama v Giuliani
Obama v Huckabee
Obama v Romney
Obama v Thompson
Hillary v McCain
Hillary v Condoleezza
Hillary v Giuliani
Hillary v Huckabee
Hillary v Jeb Bush
Hillary v Romney
Hillary v Thompson
Edwards v Huckabee
Edwards v Giuliani
Edwards v Romney
Edwards v Thompson
Gore v Giuliani
Gore v McCain

Scatter chart, all candidates
Scatter chart

One-on-one, all candidates
One-on-one

Opinion polling for the 2008 United States presidential election